The 1960 Cupa României Final was the 22nd final of Romania's most prestigious football cup competition. It was disputed between Progresul București and Dinamo Obor București, and was won by Progresul București after a game with 2 goals. It was the first cup for Progresul București.

Dinamo Obor București was the sixth club representing Divizia B which reached the Romanian Cup final.

Match details

See also 
List of Cupa României finals

References

External links
Romaniansoccer.ro

1960
Cupa
Romania
July 1960 sports events in Europe